Vinod Khanna (6 October 1946 – 27 April 2017) was an Indian actor, film producer, director and politician.
 
After making his film debut in 1968, Khanna first acted in supporting and antagonistic roles; as an angry young man in the movie Mere Apne, as the main villain in the super-hit movie Mera Gaon Mera Desh, and as the military officer turned fugitive in the critically acclaimed movie Achanak, which was a film based on the events of K. M. Nanavati v. State of Maharashtra. Khanna played lead roles in many films and is best remembered for his performances in Kuchhe Dhaage, Gaddaar, Imtihan, Muqaddar Ka Sikandar, Inkaar, Amar Akbar Anthony, Rajput, The Burning Train, Qurbani, Kudrat, Parvarish, Khoon Pasina, Dayavan, Chandni and Jurm.
 
In 1982, at the peak of his film career, Khanna temporarily quit the film industry to follow his spiritual guru Osho Rajneesh. After a 5-year hiatus, he returned to the Hindi film industry with three hit films; Insaaf and Satyamev Jayate, and Dayavan.

Filmography

References

External links
 Filmography of Vinod Khanna on IMDb

Indian filmographies
Male actor filmographies